Constitution Hill may refer to:
Constitution Hill, New South Wales, Australia
Constitution Hill, Aberystwyth
Constitution Hill, Birmingham
Constitution Hill, London, a road in the City of Westminster in London
Constitution Hill, Swansea
Constitution Hill, Johannesburg, South Africa
Constitution Hill, Dublin, Republic of Ireland
Constitution Hill, Quezon City, Philippines

Constitution Hill (horse), a thoroughbred racehorse